Paul Fawcett Greenfield AO was the President and Vice Chancellor of The University of Queensland from 1 January 2008 to 13 January 2012.

Career
As Vice Chancellor, he was the university's chief executive officer and responsible to the University Senate for the overall direction of strategic planning, finance and external affairs. As a chemical engineer, he was made an Officer in the General Division of the Order of Australia in 2006 for service to science and engineering, thereby providing recognition of his "distinguished service of a high degree to Australia". His annual salary in 2010 was reported to be A$1,069,999.

Greenfield resigned from his position as president and vice-chancellor of the university on 13 January 2012 in the aftermath of what was known as the UQ admissions scandal. The scandal related to an "irregularity" in the enrolment of a student in the medicine course who was a "close relative" of his. He had planned to step down in mid-2012 but changed his mind on 9 December 2011 and said he would leave the university on 13 January 2012. It was subsequently revealed that the "close relative" was in fact his daughter, Charlotte Greenfield, who was offered a place in the medicine course despite not having met the entry requirements and being ranked below 343 other applicants who were not admitted. The Queensland Crime and Misconduct Commission (CMC) investigated the matter and issued an investigative report in September, 2013. As Charlotte was unaware of the actions on her behalf, she remained in the University of Queensland's medical school and has since graduated as a registered medical practitioner.

Greenfield was the Chair of the Australian Nuclear Science and Technology Organisation from February 2011 to August 2014.

Honours 
Centenary Medallist in 2001 for service to Australian society in chemical engineering. 
Officer of the Order of Australia in the 2006 Australia Day Honours.

References

Academic staff of the University of Queensland
Living people
Fellows of the Australian Academy of Technological Sciences and Engineering
Officers of the Order of Australia
Year of birth missing (living people)